Todd MacDonald (born 1973 in British Columbia, Canada) is a Canadian Australian actor who is best known for his roles on the soap opera Neighbours and the drama series The Secret Life of Us and Rush.

MacDonald graduated in 1996 from the National Institute of Dramatic Art (NIDA). His Neighbours stint began in 1996, when he was hired to play Darren Stark, the son of Cheryl Stark (Caroline Gillmer). The role of Darren had previously been played by Scott Major briefly in 1993. MacDonald departed the series in 1998, returning for guest appearances in 2004 and 2005, and again in 2007 and 2008.

In the early 2000s, MacDonald played the recurring role of Nathan Lieberman on The Secret Life of Us and a supporting role in the drama series Rush in 2008. MacDonald has also appeared in BeastMaster and Blue Heelers and the movie The Jammed.

In 2013, he appeared as Thomas with Libby Munro as Vanda in a production of David Ives' 2010 play Venus in Fur by the Queensland Theatre Company in Brisbane.

References

External links 

1973 births
Australian people of Canadian descent
Australian male soap opera actors
Australian male stage actors
Living people